Bysse Molesworth (c.1697 – November 1779) was an Anglo-Irish politician. 

Molesworth was a son of Robert Molesworth, 1st Viscount Molesworth and Letitia Coote, daughter of Richard Coote, 1st Baron Coote. He was the Member of Parliament for Swords in the Irish House of Commons between 1727 and 1760. On 7 December 1731 he married Elizabeth Cole, sister of John Cole, 1st Baron Mountflorence and widow of Edward Archdall.

References

Year of birth uncertain
1779 deaths
18th-century Anglo-Irish people
Irish MPs 1727–1760
Members of the Parliament of Ireland (pre-1801) for County Dublin constituencies